The Kellogg House is a historic home located at Cornwall in Orange County, New York. It was built about 1795 and is a -story, five-bay, center-hall-plan wood-frame dwelling. It features an overhanging gable roof with exposed rafters.

It was listed on the National Register of Historic Places in 2001.

References

Houses on the National Register of Historic Places in New York (state)
Federal architecture in New York (state)
Houses in Orange County, New York
National Register of Historic Places in Orange County, New York